Fairly Secret Army is a British sitcom which ran to thirteen episodes over two series between 1984 and 1986. Though not a direct spin-off from The Fall and Rise of Reginald Perrin, the lead character, Major Harry Truscott, was very similar to Geoffrey Palmer's character of Jimmy Anderson from that series, who himself featured in a scene where he tried to recruit Reggie to a secret army with very similar aims to Truscott's (a scene repeated, near verbatim, in episode 2 of Fairly Secret Army).

The scripts were written by Reginald Perrin's creator and writer David Nobbs.

Harry Kitchener Wellington Truscott (ex Queen's Own West Mercian Lowlanders) is an inept and slightly barmy ex-army man intent on training a group of highly unlikely people into a secret paramilitary organisation. This idea first emerged in an episode of Perrin when Jimmy confided the plan to Reggie (who rubbished it) and was based on persistent and subsequently verified rumours in the 1970s press that far-right generals were secretly planning a coup to "rescue" Britain from trade union militancy. The character's name was changed because Fairly Secret Army was broadcast on Channel 4, and the television rights to The Fall and Rise of Reginald Perrin and its characters were held by the BBC.

The first series was script edited by John Cleese, whose training films company was responsible for the series. The series did not have a laughter track. Nobbs only started work on the show when he turned down an offer to write a spin-off sitcom for Manuel of Fawlty Towers.

Cast 
Geoffrey Palmer as Major Harry Truscott
Michael Robbins as Sgt. Major Throttle
Liz Fraser as Doris Entwisle
Jeremy Child as Beamish
Diane Fletcher as Nancy
Richard Ridings as Ron Boat
Ray Winstone as Stubby (Series 1)
John Nettleton as Smith (Series 2)
Gareth Forwood as Professional Man

References

External links
Fairly Secret Army at bbc.co.uk via archive.org

Fairly Secret Army at British TV Comedy
Off The Telly on Fairly Secret Army via archive.org

Channel 4 sitcoms
Military comedy television series
1984 British television series debuts
1986 British television series endings
1980s British sitcoms
English-language television shows